Trapped is a 2022 Burmese horror television series. It aired on Canal+ Zat Lenn, from June 2 to August 4, 2022, on every Thursday at 20:00 for 10 episodes.

Synopsis
When a group of students left to work at night for a university prom open a mysterious book, they become trapped inside it and have to go on missions to get out and face supernatural events, will they be able to succeed?

Cast
Phone Thiri Kyaw as Hnin Set
Aung Zay Ya Min Htin as Zaw Shein
Wan Wan as San Madi
Swan Htet Nyi Nyi as Ah Win
Aye Min Hein as Han Gyi
Man Dana as Saya San
Thinzar as Cynthia
Nan Eaindray as Natasha

References

Burmese television series